Renate is a comune in the region of Lombardy within the province of Monza and Brianza.

References